A blondie (also known as a blonde brownie) is a variety of dessert bar. It resembles a chocolate brownie, but substitutes vanilla in place of cocoa, and contains brown sugar. Blondies also contain flour, butter, eggs, and baking powder and may also contain walnuts or pecans, white or dark chocolate chips, butterscotch chips, toffee chips, or other flavored chips.

Blondies differ significantly from white chocolate brownies. Unlike the white chocolate brownie or the normal brownie, they contain no chocolate or chocolate flavouring, other than chocolate chips, which may be included. They may also contain coconut, nuts, toffee, or any other chunky candy for added texture. Blondies are not usually frosted; the brown sugar tends to be sweet enough. A variation is the Congo bar, which contains chocolate chips with either walnuts or coconut.

They are baked in a pan in an oven in a manner similar to that of the baking of traditional brownies, then they are cut into rectangular shapes for serving. Blondies are sometimes served in sundaes, often topped with caramel sauce.

History
Blondies existed for at least ten years before chocolate brownies; "dense, fudgy, butterscotch-flavoured bar[s]" existed in the late 19th century, and chocolate brownies were not developed until 1905.

Notes

References

American desserts
Baked goods